Goran Bošković (born 11 October 1976) is a Serbian football manager and former player.

Playing career
After playing for Mladost Lučani, Bošković spent three seasons with Red Star Belgrade from 1996 to 1999, winning two national cup trophies. He later played professionally in Turkey and Kazakhstan.

Managerial career
Bošković briefly served as manager of Radnički Nova Pazova in 2021.

Honours
Red Star Belgrade
 FR Yugoslavia Cup: 1996–97, 1998–99

References

External links
 
 
 
 

1976 births
Living people
Footballers from Belgrade
Serbia and Montenegro footballers
Serbian footballers
Association football midfielders
FK Mladost Lučani players
Red Star Belgrade footballers
FK Sutjeska Nikšić players
Siirtspor footballers
FK Remont Čačak players
FK Radnički Obrenovac players
FC Irtysh Pavlodar players
FC Kairat players
FK Zemun players
FC Atyrau players
FK Radnički Nova Pazova players
First League of Serbia and Montenegro players
Süper Lig players
Second League of Serbia and Montenegro players
Kazakhstan Premier League players
Serbian First League players
Serbia and Montenegro expatriate footballers
Serbian expatriate footballers
Expatriate footballers in Turkey
Expatriate footballers in Kazakhstan
Serbia and Montenegro expatriate sportspeople in Turkey
Serbian expatriate sportspeople in Kazakhstan
Serbian football managers